Narsieh ( Narseh) was a Persian general who fled to the Tang dynasty with his father, Peroz III, son of Yazdegerd III, the last Sassanid emperor of Persia, after the Muslim conquest of Persia.

He was escorted back to Persia with a Chinese army led by Pei Xingjian in 679, in order to restore him to the Sasanian throne, but the army stopped in Tokharistan. Pei Xingjian fought successfully against an invasion of Anxi led by the Western Turkic Khan Ashina Duzhi, but Pei then lost his interests in reinstalling the Persian King and left Narsieh in the Anxi Protectorate alone, although Narsieh was still able to maintain his many servants and a high quality of life. Minor Turkic chieftains in the region then pledged their loyalty to the Chinese dynasty due to the defeat of Ashina. The overall result of Pei's expedition was a success for the Tang empire. Upon returning to China, Pei was appointed the minister of rituals and Great general of the right flank guards.

Narsieh then spent the next twenty years fighting the Arabs in Tokharistan until he returned to the Tang China capital of Chang'an in 707, where he lived out the remainder of his life before dying from disease. His sons and daughters married into the Chinese nobility.

Narsieh's uncle, Bahram VII, died in 710, and Bahram's son, Khosrow, was mentioned fighting alongside Sogdians and Turks against the Arabs at the siege of Kamarja in 729 in a futile attempt to reclaim the Sasanian throne. This is perhaps the last known reference to any direct descendant of Yazdegerd III.

See also
Iranians in China

References

Sasanian princes
Tang dynasty generals
7th-century Iranian people